Pieterse is a Dutch and Afrikaans patronymic surname. The surname was first used in Netherlands before the colonial era. After the Dutch established a colony in the Cape of Good Hope, people with the surname Pieterse moved to the colony and as a consequence, Pieterse is a common Afrikaans surname.

Notable people with the surname include:

Barend Pieterse (born 1979), South African rugby union player
Cosmo Pieterse (born 1930), South African playwright, actor, poet, literary critic and anthologist
Dylan Pieterse (born 1995), South African rugby player
Erasmus Pieterse (born 1992), South African field hockey player
Ernie Pieterse (born 1938), South African racing driver
Happy Pieterse (1942–2013), South African boxer
Jan Pieterse (born 1942), Dutch cyclist
Jan Nederveen Pieterse (born 1946), Dutch sociologist
Liberius Pieterse (1905–1973), Dutch Roman Catholic priest in Pakistan
Reyaad Pieterse (born 1992), South African footballer
Sasha Pieterse (born 1996), South African actress and singer
Marissa Pieterse (born 1989), South African Actuary

Fictional
, protagonist of the novel of the same name by Multatuli
Woutertje Pieterse Prijs, Dutch literary award named after this character

See also
Pieters
Pietersen

Afrikaans-language surnames
Dutch-language surnames
Patronymic surnames
Surnames from given names